Jürgen Croy (born 19 October 1946) is a former footballer who played as a goalkeeper. He made 86 appearances for the German Democratic Republic national team.

Club career
Born in Zwickau, Germany, Croy spent his entire footballing career at BSG Sachsenring Zwickau (today FSV Zwickau), with which he won the East German Cup in 1967 and 1975. He was one of East Germany's few international players not to play for a top club such as Dynamo Dresden, FC Carl Zeiss Jena, or FC Magdeburg.  As such, Croy did not get the chance to play frequently in European competitions and did not gain the international fame he deserved.  Though tall (186 cm), he was an outstanding shot-stopper capable of amazing reflexes on his line.  Combined with an excellent command of his penalty area, first-rate ball-handling skills, and above-average consistency, this quality made Croy one of the best goalkeepers of his time and arguably one of the best ever.  East and West German media alike often placed him on an equal footing with his contemporaries Sepp Maier and Dino Zoff, two of the game's all-time legends.

Croy was voted GDR Footballer of the Year in 1972, 1976, and 1978 by the East German football press.  He played 372 East Germany first-division matches in his career.

International career
Croy earned his first East Germany cap in May 1967 against Sweden (1–0).  He was the starting goalkeeper during East Germany's only World Cup appearance in 1974.  In particular, Croy stood in goal for the GDR's historic 1–0 victory over its West German neighbor in the only match ever to oppose the two Germany national teams.  Two years later, Croy celebrated his greatest sporting triumph with the win of the gold medal in the Olympic football tournament.  Croy went on to play 86 times for his country, the last one a 5–0 victory over Cuba in May 1981.

Post-playing life
At the end of his footballing career, Croy worked as a football instructor for some time.  From 1991 to 2001, he served as city commissioner for education, culture, and sports in his hometown of Zwickau. He then became the managing director of the Zwickau Chamber of Commerce, Tourism, and Culture until his retirement in 2010.

References

External links

 
 
 
 Jürgen Croy profile at goalkeepersaredifferent.com

1946 births
Living people
People from Zwickau
German footballers
East German footballers
Footballers from Saxony
Association football goalkeepers
Footballers at the 1972 Summer Olympics
1974 FIFA World Cup players
Footballers at the 1976 Summer Olympics
Olympic footballers of East Germany
Olympic gold medalists for East Germany
Olympic bronze medalists for East Germany
East Germany international footballers
FSV Zwickau players
Olympic medalists in football
DDR-Oberliga players
Medalists at the 1976 Summer Olympics
Medalists at the 1972 Summer Olympics
FSV Zwickau managers
Recipients of the Patriotic Order of Merit in silver
East German football managers
People from Bezirk Karl-Marx-Stadt